Nestor Dhamba (born 19 February 1990) is an Indian-born cricketer who plays for the Oman national cricket team. He played for Oman in their opening fixture of the 2017 ICC World Cricket League Division Three tournament, against the United States. In October 2018, he was named in Oman's squad for the 2018 ICC World Cricket League Division Three tournament.

In December 2018, he was named in Oman's team for the 2018 ACC Emerging Teams Asia Cup. In September 2021, he was named in Oman's squad for the 2021 ICC Men's T20 World Cup. He was one of two uncapped players to be named in Oman's squad. He was also named in Oman's One Day International (ODI) squad for their tri-series in Oman. He made his ODI debut on 14 September 2021, for Oman against Nepal.

In February 2022, he was named in Oman's Twenty20 International (T20I) squad for the 2021–22 Oman Quadrangular Series. He made his T20I debut on 24 February 2022, for Oman against Nepal in the 2022 ICC Men's T20 World Cup Global Qualifier A tournament.

References

External links
 

1990 births
Living people
People from Thane
Cricketers from Maharashtra
Omani cricketers
Oman One Day International cricketers
Oman Twenty20 International cricketers
Indian emigrants to Oman
Indian expatriates in Oman